Rabo de Junco (also: Monte Leão) is a hill on the west coast of the island of Sal in Cape Verde. Its steep eroded south face towards the bay is an important nesting area for birds. Rabo de Junco and the surrounding  are protected as a nature reserve.
It was mentioned as Rabadyunk in the 1747 map by Jacques-Nicolas Bellin. To its west lies the uninhabited islet Ilhéu Rabo de Junco.

See also
List of mountains in Cape Verde
List of protected areas in Cape Verde

References

Mountains of Cape Verde
Geography of Sal, Cape Verde
Protected areas of Cape Verde